State Route 188 (SR 188) is a  state highway that serves as an east-west connection through southern Mobile County. SR 188 intersects Interstate 10 (I-10) at its western terminus and SR 193 at its eastern terminus.

Route description

SR 188 begins just north of its intersection with I-10 just north of Grand Bay. From this point, the route travels in a southerly direction through a brief concurrency with US 90 before taking a southeasterly course upon leaving Grand Bay. SR 188 continues its southeasterly course just prior to reaching Bayou La Batre where it turns to the south and remains in a north-south orientation. Upon its exit from Bayou La Batre, SR 188 returns to its easterly course to pass through Coden and Heron Bay before reaching its eastern terminus at SR 193 in Alabama Port.

Major intersections

References

188
Transportation in Mobile County, Alabama